The High Commissioner of Malaysia to the Republic of Fiji is the head of Malaysia's diplomatic mission to Fiji. The position has the rank and status of an Ambassador Extraordinary and Plenipotentiary and is based in the High Commission of Malaysia, Suva.

List of heads of mission

Chargés d'Affaires to Fiji

High Commissioners to Fiji

See also
 Fiji–Malaysia relations

References 

 
Fiji
Malaysia